Nam Yeon-woo (born October 9, 1982) is a South Korean actor. Nam played his first leading role in a feature film in Lee Don-ku's indie Fatal (2013).

Filmography

Awards and nominations

References

External links 
 
 
 

1982 births
Living people
South Korean male film actors
Korea National University of Arts alumni